Uponor Oyj is a  Finnish company that sells products for drinking water delivery, radiant heating and cooling. 
Uponor Group has approximately 3,700 employees.

Uponor Corporation's shares have been listed on the Helsinki Stock Exchange, with ticker symbol UPONOR, since 6 June 1988. Based in Finland, Uponor is listed in the Mid Cap segment on Nasdaq Helsinki exchange.

The corporation's head office is in the city of Vantaa, Finland in the vicinity of the Helsinki airport.

Business
Uponor's business consists of three product groups: 
Indoor climate  (heating, cooling, and ventilation) (23%) 
Plumbing (55%) 
Infrastructure (22%)

Uponor's business is divided into three business segments:  
Building Solutions - Europe 
Building Solutions - North America 
Uponor Infra

Uponor's customers include building industry professionals, such as distributors and installers, designers, architects, project developers and other construction sector service providers.

Uponor's indoor climate offering includes integrated radiant heating, cooling and ventilation products.
Uponor's portfolio includes water pipes used in buildings, including potable water and radiator connection pipes. Uponor's PEX and composite pipe systems are used for renovation and modernisation projects.

Uponor Infra is the result of a merger between Uponor Infrastructure and KWH Pipe whose products are used in new and rehabilitation infrastructure projects associated with water and wastewater piping, storm-water management, gas distribution, culvert reline and slip lining. 
This division has manufacturing units in Europe, developing and manufacturing of structural profile pipe (Weholite) and tanks (Wehopanel) systems for the managing and distribution of water, drainage, energy, electricity, telecommunications and data.
Uponor Infra North America was acquired by Wynnchurch Capital in August 2017 and now operates under the name of Infra Pipe Solutions.

Uponor Corporation's major registered shareholders (31.12.2019):

 Oras Invest Ltd (investment company of the Paasikivi family) (24.6%)
 Varma Mutual Pension Insurance Company (5.3%)
 Nordea Nordic Small Cap Fund (4.4%)
 Ilmarinen Mutual Pension Insurance Company (2.8%)
 Mandatum Life Insurance Company Limited (2.8%)

Of the total shareholding, 27.2% are in foreign ownership.

References

6. "Acquisition of Uponor Infra NA" https://www.wynnchurch.com/portfolio/infra-pipe

Companies listed on Nasdaq Helsinki
Manufacturing companies of Finland